Diwakar Raote  is a leader of Shiv Sena from Maharashtra.
On 5 December 2014 Raote took charge as the Cabinet Minister of Transport in Maharashtra Government. He is also the  guardian minister of Parbhani and Nanded Districts.
Earlier he was entrusted with the responsibility of establishing the organization in Marathwada after the party's decision in 1985 to expand to whole Maharashtra. He became Mayor of Mumbai in 1991. In Narayan Rane ministry, he was a cabinet minister of Revenue, Government of Maharashtra.

He belongs to the Panchkalshi, a scribal caste community of Hindu society in Maharashtra mostly found in Mumbai and the North Konkan region.

Positions held
 1991-1992: Mayor of Mumbai
 Leader, Shiv Sena 
 1995-1999: Cabinet Minister Maharashtra.
 2004: Elected to Maharashtra Legislative Council
 2008: Shiv Sena Party group Leader in the Maharashtra Legislative Council
 2010: Elected to Maharashtra Legislative Council
 2014: Cabinet Minister of Transport in Maharashtra State Government
 2014-2016: Guardian minister of Parbhani and Nanded
 2016: Elected to Maharashtra Legislative Council
 2017: Guardian minister of Osmanabad

See also
 Devendra Fadnavis ministry

References

External links
 Shivsena Home Page
 http://www.dnaindia.com/mumbai/report-maharashtra-cm-devendra-fadnavis-team-portfolios-allocated-bjp-retains-key-departments-2041510

Shiv Sena politicians
Mayors of Mumbai
Members of the Maharashtra Legislative Council
State cabinet ministers of Maharashtra
Living people
Year of birth missing (living people)